Center of Six is a second posthumous release of music by singer-songwriter Josh Clayton-Felt. It features previously unreleased songs by Josh Clayton-Felt and songs by Josh's friends written and recorded for him after his death.

Recording
The first part of the album features songs composed by Josh Clayton-Felt in the winter of 1996–97 in Kinsale, Ireland and recorded by him with his backing band in Los Angeles.

The second part consist of tribute songs written for Josh. The musicians that participated include Raina Lee Scott, who have previously added additional vocals to Spirit Touches Ground, former lead singer of Men at Work Colin Hay, Kevin Hunter of the former San Francisco band Wire Train, the Los Angeles-based musicians Jami Lula Washington and Sage, musician and actor Andras Jones, the Irish musician and composer Linda Buckley, Los Angeles musician Renee Stahl and actress Renee Faia.

Music and lyrics
Josh Clayton-Felt's songs on the album are in search of the self and the journey inward. The title song refers to finding a center in the six Native American directions: North, South, East, West, Up (All Father/Heavens), and Down (Grandmother Earth), and speaks of memory of "when the wind blew... when the sky knew.... when the earth told me not to forget" while on the song "Sacred Mountain" Josh imagines his future. The songs “Forever Self”, “Two Sides”, and “Intermission” head into the direction of Clayton-Felt’s funk-pop interests.

Release
Center of Six was originally intended to be the title of the follow up record to Josh's debut solo album Inarticulate Nature Boy but during the final stages of work on the album that eventually was released as Spirit Touches Ground both the title Center of Six and the song had been set aside by Josh for a possible future.

After the release of Spirit Touches Ground more tracks by Josh Clayton-Felt were prepared for release. The co-executive producer for the album as well as producer of several tracks was Chad Fischer who previously played with Josh Clayton-Felt in School of Fish and did mixing of Spirit Touches Ground album.

The album was released only on CD with proceeds from sales donated to Descendants of the Earth, a non-profit Native American organization to which Clayton-Felt was dedicated.

Several songs by Josh's friends that were included on the album have been previously released. The song "Complicated O" by andras Jones have been released on his EP Complicated '00 in 2001. The song "Dear J" by Colin Hay was previously released on his 2002 studio album Company of Strangers.

Reception
Patrick Schabe in the PopMatters review wrote that "Center of Six is what a true tribute album really should be all about: celebrating the life of the artist" with "a small but tasty dose of Josh’s own work" and "some wonderfully touching, almost gut-wrenching, eulogies to the man himself".

Track listing

Personnel

Josh Clayton-Felt
Josh Clayton-Felt – vocals, guitar, flute
Paul Bunshell – bass
Davey Faragher – bass
Patrick Leonard – keyboards, producer
Brian McLeod – drums
Pete Maloney – drums
DC Collard – organ
Martin Tillman – cello
Louise Goffin – keyboards
Patrick Warren – chamberlin
Tony Phillips – producer
Billy Preston – organ

Friends
Chad Fischer – keyboards, drums, percussion, piano, vocals, programming, producer, mixing
Raina Lee Scott – guitar, vocals
Kevin Hunter – performer, producer
Andras Jones – guitar, vocals
R. Walt Vincent – piano, bass, producer
Jami Lula – guitar, vocals
Jeffrey Dean – bass
Benjamin Dowling – loops, producer
Renee Faia – vocals 
Renee Stahl – vocals
Gregg Sarfaty – guitar 
Sage – vocals, bass, guitar, strings
Vinnie Colaiuta – drums
Alex Alessandroni Jr – piano, keyboards
Colin Hay – guitar, vocals, producer
Linda Buckley – performer
Mel Mercier – performer
Sean Duane – producer

References

2003 albums
Josh Clayton-Felt albums
Tribute albums
Albums produced by Chad Fischer
Albums published posthumously